Storme Warren is an American television and radio broadcaster best known as the host of The Storme Warren morning show on SiriusXM's channel The Highway.

Storme also created Stone Beaver productions where he produced the popular entertainment news magazine show Headline Country which aired on the GAC Television network for 12 years. His television career began as a segment producer on CNN's Showbiz Today, and then on to TNN Country News and This Week in Country Music as an entertainment reporter.

In December 2009, The Tennessean wrote that Warren was the "Dick Clark of Nashville." He hosted the inaugural "Music City New Year's Eve Bash on Broadway" in 2009/2010. He is also a host for selected events at the CMA Music Festival and at Nashville's 4 July "Let Freedom Ring" celebration.

In February, 2020, Warren was given the "BMI Ambassador Award" to recognize his support and promotion of Nashville's vibrant songwriting community.

Career timeline
1990–1992: CNN - cameraman
1992– 1993: Showbiz Today - reporter
1993–2002: The Nashville Network (TNN)
April, 2003–2014: Headline Country - host, executive producer, writer

References

External links
The Highway
Headline Country
Great American Country

American television personalities
1970 births
Living people